Pervomaysky is a rural locality (a settlement) in Novoselskoye Rural Settlement, Kovrovsky District, Vladimir Oblast, Russia. The population was 1,341 as of 2010. There are 2 streets.

Geography 
Pervomaysky is located 8 km south of Kovrov (the district's administrative centre) by road. Melekhovo is the nearest rural locality.

References 

Rural localities in Kovrovsky District